was a Japanese avant-garde poet, art critic, and translator who was active during the Taishō period of Japan. He was associated with Japanese futurism.

Biography

Hirato Renkichi is the pen name of Kawahata Seiichi. He was born in what is now Takatsuki, Osaka, Japan, in 1893. His father was a military sniper who left the family, leaving Hirato and his mother in poverty. He attended Sophia University in Tokyo for three years before dropping out of school. He later studied at Gyosei Gakkō, a Catholic language school.

His first publication was in Bansō (Accompaniment), a literary journal that was edited by the poet and literary critic Ryuko Kawaji. Kawaji was his mentor, and occasionally also helped Hirato financially. Hirato wrote poems and art criticism for coterie journals, including Gendai Shiika (Modern Poetry), Taimatsu (Torchlight), and the proletariat journal Tane maku hito (Sower). His translations of Paul Fort, Arthur Symons, and Jean Cocteau appeared in various literary magazines. In 1921, 10 years after Marinetti's "Manifesto of Futurism", he created flyers of “Nihon miraiha undo dai ikkai no sengen” (First Manifesto of Japanese Futurism) and handed them out in several locations across Tokyo.

Hirato died of complications from a pulmonary disease on July 20, 1922. A posthumous collection of his poems was published in 1931 by Kawaji Ryūkō, Kanbara Tai, Hagiwara Kyōjiro, and Yamazaki Yasuo.

Selected works

 Hirato Renkichi shishū (Selected Poems of Hirato Renkichi), Hirato Renkichi shuppan kankōkai, 1931.
 Spiral Staircase: collected poems, translated by Sho Sugita, 2017

References

Hirato Renkichi 

20th-century Japanese poets
1893 births
1922 deaths